Kim Eun-kyeong (born 3 September 1991) is a South Korean handball player for Gyeongnam and the South Korean Republic national team.

References

1991 births
Living people
South Korean female handball players